Illicit Dreams is a 1994 American erotic thriller film directed by Andrew Stevens and produced by Ashok Amritraj. with music composed by Claude Gaudette. The film stars Andrew Stevens, Shannon Tweed (reuniting the two from Night Eyes 2 and 3) and also stars Joe Cortese, Michelle Johnson and Brad Blaisdell.

Plot synopsis
Dr. Daniel Davis is married to Moira, both of whom have a rocky relationship; Dan has seduced several women who are his patients while treating his wife carelessly. Moira frequently dreams of visiting a large house and makes love to a man named Nick. One day, Moira sees a house that resembles the one in her dream and, to her surprise, Nick is waiting inside. Moira and Nick soon start a love affair. Daniel finds out about it, gets jealous, and intervenes, so Nick protects Moira from him.

Cast
 Andrew Stevens as Nick Richardson
 Shannon Tweed as Moira Davis
 Joe Cortese as Daniel Davis
 Michelle Johnson as Melinda Ryan
 Brad Blaisdell as Reed
 Stella Stevens as Cicily
 Rochelle Swanson as Beverly Keen
 Dave Carlton as Investigaton
 Jennifer Bassey as Real Estate Woman

References

External links
 
 

1994 films
1990s thriller drama films
American thriller drama films
American erotic thriller films
Films set in the United States
Films shot in California
1994 drama films
1990s English-language films
Films directed by Andrew Stevens
1990s American films